The Secret Museum or Secret Cabinet in Naples is the collection of 1st-century Roman erotic art found in Pompeii and Herculaneum, now held in separate galleries at the National Archaeological Museum in Naples, the former Museo Borbonico. The term "cabinet" is used in reference to the "cabinet of curiosities" - i.e. any well-presented collection of objects to admire and study. 

Re-opened, closed, re-opened again and then closed again for nearly 100 years, the secret room was briefly made accessible again at the end of the 1960s before being finally re-opened in 2000. Since 2005 the collection has been kept in a separate room in the Naples National Archaeological Museum.

Although the excavation of Pompeii was initially an Enlightenment project, once artifacts were classified through a new method of taxonomy, those deemed obscene and unsuitable for the general public were termed pornography and in 1821 they were locked away in a Secret Museum. The doorway was bricked up in 1849. Throughout ancient Pompeii and Herculaneum, erotic frescoes, depictions of the god Priapus, sexually explicit symbols and inscriptions, and household items such as phallic oil lamps were found. The ancient Roman understanding of sexuality viewed explicit material very differently from most present-day cultures.  Ideas about obscenity developed from the 18th century to the present day into a modern concept of pornography.

At Pompeii, locked metal cabinets were constructed over erotic frescos, which could be shown, for an additional fee, to gentlemen but not to ladies. This peep show was still in operation at Pompeii in the 1960s. The cabinet was only accessible to "people of mature age and respected morals", which in practice meant only educated men. 

The catalogue of the secret museum was also a form of censorship, as engravings and descriptive texts played down the content of the room.

Gallery

See also 

 Erotic art in Pompeii and Herculaneum
 History of erotic depictions
 History of human sexuality
 Homosexuality in ancient Greece
 Homosexuality in ancient Rome
 Sexuality in ancient Rome

Notes

References

Further reading

  (translated from the original 1975 Italian edition).
 
 

Collections of the National Archaeological Museum, Naples
Art museums and galleries in Campania
Archaeological museums in Italy
Museums in Naples
Sex museums
Sexuality in Italy
Censorship in Italy
Sexuality in classical antiquity
National Archaeological Museum, Naples